Korea.net or KOREA.net is the official web portal of the South Korean government.

Overview 
Korea.net is operated by the Korean Culture and Information Service. As of 2021, it is available in Arabic, Chinese, English, French, German, Japanese, Russian, Spanish and Vietnamese.

See also
GOV.UK
USA.gov

References

External links

Government services portals
South Korean websites